Tampereen Ilves Naiset are an ice hockey team in the Naisten Liiga, the premier women's ice hockey league in Finland. They are the representative women's team of the multi-sport club Ilves, based in Tampere, Pirkanmaa, and their home arena is the Tesoman jäähalli in Tampere's Tesoma district. They are the only team to have iced a team every season since the establishment of the Naisten SM-sarja in 1982 (renamed Naisten Liiga in 2017). The team ranks second on the list of most Aurora Borealis Cup wins, with ten, and has claimed the most Finnish Championship medals in league history, with ten gold, twelve silver, and six bronze for 28 total medals.

Season-by-season results 
This is a partial list of the most recent seasons completed by Tampereen Ilves Naiset. Note: Finish = Rank at end of regular season; GP = Games played, W = Wins (3 points), OTW = Overtime wins (2 points), OTL = Overtime losses (1 point), L = Losses, GF = Goals for, GA = Goals against, Pts = Points, Top scorer: Points (Goals+Assists)

Players and personnel

2022–23 roster 

Coaching staff and team personnel
 Head coach: Marjo Voutilainen
 Assistant coach: Merja Halmetoja
 Assistant coach: Reetu Kulhua
 Goaltending coach: Juha Nieminen
 Conditioning Coach: Yin Tuorila
 Equipment managers: Kari Broman & Markku Salminen

Team captaincy history 
 Marianne Ihalainen, 1990–1998
 Mari Östring, 1999–2000
 Marianne Ihalainen, 2000–01
 Evelina Similä, 2001–02
 Mari Saarinen, 2007–2011
 Johanna Koivula, 2011–2014
 Anna Kilponen, 2014–15
 Satu-Annika Parkusjärvi, 2015–16
 Anne Tuomanen, 2016–17
 Linda Leppänen, 2017–18
 Anne Tuomanen, 2018–19
 Johanna Juutilainen, 2019–20
 Anna Kilponen, 2020–January 2022
 Jenna Lehtiniemi, January 2022–2022
 Helen Puputti, 2022–

Head coaches 
 Markku Hannunkivi, 1992–93
 Petteri Linna & Jarmo Nurmi, 1994–1996
 Janne Hakala & Markku Hannunkivi, 1996–97
 Antti Kallioinen & Ville Tolvanen, 1997–1999
 Tapio Koho, 1999–2002
 Marianne Ihalainen, 2002–2006
 Samuli Marjeta, 2009–13 January 2012
 Severi Lehtonen, 13 January 2012–March 2012
 Timo Lindqvist, August 2012–28 October 2012
 Jouko Urvikko, 28 October 2012–2013
 Osmo Lindström, 2014–2016
 Mari Saarinen, 2016–2018
 Jarmo Jamalainen, 2018–19
 Ville Tolvanen, 2019–20
 Linda Leppänen, 2020–2022
 Marjo Voutilainen, 2022–

Retired numbers 
#10 Anne Haanpää
#16 Marianne Ihalainen

Honours and awards

Finnish Championship 
  Aurora Borealis Cup (10): 1985, 1986, 1987, 1988, 1990, 1991, 1992, 1993, 2006, 2010
  Runners-up (12): 1983, 1989, 1994, 1995, 2004, 2005, 2008, 2009, 2011, 2012, 2018, 2019
  Third Place (6): 1984, 1999, 2000, 2001, 2003, 2015

IIHF European Women's Champions Cup
  Gold (1): 2011
Sources:

Player awards 
Finnish Ice Hockey Association trophies recognizing individual players won by Ilves team members. Former Ilves head coach Linda Leppänen is the most prolific award winner in both team history, winning both the highest number of trophies, with seven, and the broadest variety of trophies, with five different awards.

 Riikka Nieminen Award (Player of the Year)
2009–10: Jenni Hiirikoski
2017–18: Linda Valimaki
 Päivi Halonen Award (Best defenceman)
 2005–06: Heidi Pelttari
 Tuula Puputti Award (Best goaltender)
 2005–06: Maija Hassinen
 2007–08: Maija Hassinen
 2020–21: Anni Keisala
 Katja Riipi Award (Best forward)
2005–06: Saara Tuominen
2009–10: Linda Valimaki
 Noora Räty Award (Best rookie)
 2010–11: Venla Kotkaslahti
 Marianne Ihalainen Award (Top point scorer)
 1984–85: Anne Haanpää
 1989–90: Marianne Ihalainen
 1991–92: Anne Nurmi
 1994–95: Sari Fisk
 2009–10: Linda Valimaki
 2017–18: Linda Valimaki
 Tiia Reima Award (Top goal scorer)
 1984–85: Anne Haanpää
 1989–90: Marianne Ihalainen
 1991–92: Anne Nurmi
 1994–95: Sari Marjamäki
 2000–01: Sari Marjamäki
 2009–10: Linda Valimaki
 2017–18: Linda Valimaki
 Sari Fisk Award (Best plus/minus)
2011–12: Heidi Pelttari
 Emma Laaksonen Award (Fair-play player)
2011–12: Satu Niinimäki
 Karoliina Rantamäki Award (Playoff MVP)
 2005–06: Maija Hassinen
 2009–10: Linda Valimaki
 Student Athlete of the Year
2019–20: Tanja Koljonen

All-Stars 
Naisten Liiga All-Star First Team

 2007–08: Maija Hassinen-Sullanmaa (G), Jenni Hiirikoski (D)
 2008–09: Linda Valimaki (C)
 2009–10: Jenni Hiirikoski (D), Linda Valimaki (C), Sari Kärnä (RW)
 2010–11: Anna Kilponen (D)
 2011–12: Heidi Peltari (D)
 2017–18: Linda Valimaki (C), Riikka Noronen (RW)
 2020–21: Anni Keisala (G), Anna Kilponen (D)

Naisten Liiga All-Star Second Team

Second Team All-Star honors were not awarded prior to the 2017–18 season.

 2018–19: Reetu Kulhua (D), Linda Valimaki (C)
 2019–20: Reetu Kulhua (D)
 2020–21: Jenna Suokko (LW)

Player of the Month 

October 2017: Linda Valimaki
January 2021: Anni Keisala

Team records and leaders

Single-season records
Most goals in a season: Tiia Reima, 56 goals (24 games; 1993–94)
Most assists in a season: Jenni Hiirikoski, 39 assists (19 games; 2009–10)
Most points in a season: Tiia Reima, 85 points (24 games; 1993–94)
Most points in a season, defenceman: Kirsi Hirvonen, 56 points (23 games; 1993–94)
Most points per game (P/G) in a season, over ten games played: Linda Leppänen, 4.05 P/G (19 games; 2009–10)

Most penalty minutes (PIM) in a season: Rosa Lindstedt, 84 PIM (24 games; 2010–11)
Best save percentage in a season, over ten games played: Vilma Vaattovaara, .951 SV% (16 games; 2011–12)
Best goals against average (GAA) in a season, over ten games played: Vilma Vaattovaara, 1.09  GAA (16 games; 2011–12)

Career records 
Most career goals: Marianne Ihalainen, 320 goals (323 games; 1982–2001)
Most career assists: Johanna Koivula, 302 assists (495 games; 1997–2018)
Most career points: Marianne Ihalainen, 602 points (323 games; 1982–2001)
Most career points, defenceman: Anna Aaltomaa, 203 points (279 games; 1992–2006)
Best career points per game, over 30 games played: Linda Leppänen, 2.108 P/G (157 games; 2005–2019)
Most career penalty minutes: Johanna Koivula, 323 PIM (495 games; 1997–2018)
Most games played, skater: Johanna Koivula, 495 games (1997–2018)
Most games played, goaltender: Viivi Vartia-Koivisto, 98 games (2008–2021)

All-time scoring leaders
The top-ten point-scorers in franchise history.

Note: Nat = Nationality; Pos = Position; GP = Games played; G = Goals; A = Assists; Pts = Points; P/G = Points per game;  = current Ilves player; Bold indicates franchise record

Source(s):

Notable alumni 

Years active with Ilves listed alongside player name.
Kati Ahonen, 1982–1989
Anne Haanpää, 1983–1986, 1987–1991 & 1997–1998
Maija Hassinen-Sullanmaa, 2003–2008
Jenni Hiirikoski, 2001–2005, 2007–08 & 2009–10
Kirsi Hirvonen, 1989–1994
Venla Hovi, 2003–2010
Marianne Ihalainen, 1982–2001
Sari Kärnä, 2009–2018
Marika Lehtimäki, 1989–1998
Linda Leppänen, 2005–2010 & 2017–2019
Rosa Lindstedt, 2007–2012
Sari Marjamäki, 1993–2002
Leena Majaranta, 1982–1990
Saara Niemi, 2002–2006 & 2010–11
Heidi Pelttari, 2002–2006 & 2010–2015
Tiia Reima, 1988–1994 & 1996–2000
Mari Saarinen, 1998–2012 & 2014–15
Hanne Sikiö, 1996–1997 & 2003–04
Eveliina Similä, 1998–2007
Liisa-Maria Sneck, 1989–1994
Jenna Suokko, 2010–2021
Päivi Virta (previously Halonen), 1982–1990

International players 
 Nina Linde, 2004–2006 & 2009–10
 Tawni Jaakola, 2010–11
 Nadina Niciu, 2020–21
 Patricia Zum Hingst, 1996–1999

See also 
 Finland women's national ice hockey team
 Women's ice hockey in Finland

References

External links 
Team information and statistics from Eliteprospects.com and Eurohockey.com and Hockeyarchives.info (in French)
Official website (in Finnish)

Naisten Liiga (ice hockey) teams
Sport in Tampere
1982 establishments in Finland